Housing in Russia reflects the country's history, geography and traditions. According to Russian Public Opinion Research Center 65 percent of Russians live in apartments, 31 percent in a private house and 4 percent in dormitories. The share of Russians who own an apartment or a house is relatively high and amounts to about 54 percent. About 11 percent reside in a rented apartment or house. The rest live with their relatives or friends.

There are several major types of apartment blocks common in Russia. A Khrushchyovka is probably the most popular type. Usually it is a 4 or 5-storied concrete-paneled or brick apartment building with notoriously small apartments, extensively constructed in the 1960s and 1970s to solve the housing problem. Stalin-era buildings (Stalinka) from 1930s - 1950s are usually larger and more comfortable, however many of them require major renovation. One more type of apartment blocks is Brezhnevka built mostly in the 1970s and 1980s. Apartments there are a bit larger, and the buildings themselves are 9-16 stories high.  
Finally, the housing boom in 2000s led to wide-scale construction of new apartment buildings from economy to premium class based both on improved Soviet projects and new original decisions.

A typical Russian apartment includes a kitchen, a lavatory, sometimes a balcony and from one to three rooms. Unlike many other countries, when Russian people describe an apartment, they count all rooms, not just bedrooms. It's a common practice to have only one lavatory in the apartment, though modern apartments may have more lavatories and rooms.

Private housing boom began in the 1990s and is still going on. Most private houses are built in the suburbs of large cities. Obtaining a building permit is quite easy and the building regulations for private houses are quite liberal. The house must not be higher than 20 meters and must not have more than 3 floors. It should be located at least 5 meters from the plot border. Brick houses are more common in central and southern regions while wooden houses dominate in the north. 

As of 2019, an average price for one square meter in a new apartment amounted to 64 thousand rubles.

The Human Rights Measurement Initiative finds that Russia is fulfilling 71.7% of what they should be fulfilling for the right to housing, based on their level of income.

References 

 
Real estate in Russia
Home inspection